The Armfelt Conspiracy was a plot in Sweden in 1793. The purpose was to depose the de jure regent Duke Charles and the de facto regent Gustaf Adolf Reuterholm, leaders of the regency government of Gustav IV Adolf of Sweden, and replace them with Gustaf Mauritz Armfelt, the favorite of the king's father Gustav III of Sweden. The plot was instigated by the exiled Armfelt and handled by his agents in Sweden, notably his lover Magdalena Rudenschöld, with support of the Russian Empire under Catherine the Great. The conspiracy was exposed in 1793.

See also
 1789 Conspiracy (Sweden)
 Anjala conspiracy

References 

1793 in Sweden
1794 in Sweden
1794 in Europe
Rebellions in Sweden
Sweden during the Gustavian era
18th-century coups d'état and coup attempts
Conspiracies